San Juan Nepomuceno is a city and district in the Paraguayan department of Caazapá. It has the largest urban conglomeration of the department.

Location
It lies 249 km southeast of the national capital city, Asuncion, at the terminus of the Blas Garay highway. Blas Garay is a spur of the national highway Number 8 and forks at a crossroads near the town of Ñumí. This district is located in the east of the department and shares borders with six districts of Caazapá (clockwise: N: General Higinio Morínigo, Abaí; E: Tavaí; S: Yuty; W: Buena Vista, Caazapá) and one of the Itapúa (Alto Verá).

Population
According to the 2002 Census this district has the largest urban area of Caazapá with 6937 inhabitants in its urban conglomeration. Its total population is the third in the department, with 24,243 inhabitants, after Yuty and Abaí.

Populated places in the Caazapá Department